"More & Faster" is a KMFDM single released in 1989. The songs on this release also appeared on some European versions of UAIOE, and alternate versions of "More & Faster" and "Rip the System" both appeared on UAIOE. "More & Faster" later appeared on Virus, and "Rip the System" and "Naff Off" later appeared on the rarities collection Agogo. In 2008, KMFDM Records re-released this as a 7" vinyl single, limited to 250 copies.

Reception
Tom Popson of the Chicago Tribune said the song's vocals "actually exhibit some feeling-a bit of a novelty in a field where the singing often tends toward flat-toned, apocalyptic-doom stylings."  Andy Hinds of Allmusic called it "probably the first KMFDM classic".

Track list

Original 1989 release

2008 7" reissue

References

External links 
 

1989 singles
KMFDM songs
1989 songs
Wax Trax! Records singles
Songs written by Sascha Konietzko
Songs written by En Esch